Harold Watson (13 March 1908 – 1982) was an English footballer who played in the Football League for Brighton & Hove Albion and Stoke City.

Career
Watson played for his local club Wath Athletic before joining Stoke City in 1926. during his time at Stoke he was used mainly in the reserves and managed just four appearances in the Football League. He left in 1930 and joined  Brighton & Hove Albion and then Kidderminster Harriers.

Career statistics

References

1908 births
1982 deaths
People from Wath upon Dearne
English footballers
Association football defenders
Wath Athletic F.C. players
Stoke City F.C. players
Brighton & Hove Albion F.C. players
Kidderminster Harriers F.C. players
English Football League players